Alfonso Rodriguez may refer to:

Alphonsus Rodriguez (1532–1617), Jesuit brother, Roman Catholic Saint
Alfonso Rodríguez Olmedo (1598–1628),  Spanish Jesuit priest and martyr
Alonso Rodriguez (1538–1616), author of The Practice of Christian and Religious Perfection
Alfonso Rodriguez Jr. (born 1953), American sentenced to death penalty for murder
Alfonso Rodríguez (director) (born 1957), Dominican actor, writer and director
Alfonso Rodríguez (gymnast) (born 1965), Spanish Olympic gymnast
Alfonso Rodríguez (Captain), 17th-century Spanish mariner and merchant
Alfonso Rodríguez (sport shooter) (born 1929), Colombian sport shooter
Alfonso Rodríguez (weightlifter) (born 1948), Puerto Rican Olympic weightlifter
Alfonso Rodríguez Salas (1939–1994), Spanish footballer
Alfonso Rodríguez (athlete), Mexican athlete in 1977 Central American and Caribbean Championships in Athletics